Future-Kill (released in the UK as Night of the Alien) is a 1985 comedy science fiction-horror film about a group of fraternity boys who are hunted by mutants in a futuristic city. The film was directed by Ronald W. Moore, and stars Edwin Neal, Marilyn Burns and Gabriel Folse. The poster for the film was designed by the renowned artist H. R. Giger.

Plot
A group of protesters who call themselves "mutants" have taken over the inner city streets of a large city. They dress weirdly to try to show the effects of toxic poisoning. One of the mutants, Splatter, has really been affected. A group of fraternity boys decide to go into the mutant territory and kidnap one of the mutants as a prank. They are inadvertently framed for the murder of the mutant leader and are hunted through the abandoned buildings and dark streets by the crazed Splatter and his gang.

Cast
 Edwin Neal as Splatter
 Marilyn Burns as Dorothy Grim
 Gabriel Folse as Paul
 Wade Reese as Steve
 Barton Faulks as Tom
 Rob Rowley as Jay
 Craig Kanne as Clint
 Jeffrey Scott as George
 Alice Villarreal as Julie
 Doug Davis as Eddie Pain
 Bruce Falke as Really Cool Frat

Reception

Critical reception for the film has been mixed to negative. Allmovie gave the film a mixed review stating, "Filled with all sorts of anti-nuclear mumbo jumbo bred straight out of the Cold War Reagan era, Future Kill is slightly interesting for its relative place in history, but better viewed as '80s trash cinema whose long life on home video spawned more memories of its box art than anything else."
Felix Vasquez Jr. from Cinema Crazed gave the film a negative review calling the film, "immensely dated and standard science fiction punk flick from the era of leather jackets and Mohawks".
TV Guide awarded the film 2 out of 4 stars stating that it "serve[d] no purpose but to sate juvenile blood lust and to take people's money".

Home media
The film was released on DVD by Subversive Cinema on October 31, 2006, in widescreen formatting and included a "Making of" featurette, full length commentary by the director Ronald Moore and the producer/star Edwin Neal, cast and crew biographies and a reproduction of Giger's original artwork.

References

External links
 
 
 

1985 films
1985 horror films
1980s comedy horror films
1980s science fiction horror films
American science fiction comedy films
American comedy horror films
American science fiction horror films
1980s English-language films
Films about fraternities and sororities
American post-apocalyptic films
Films about fratricide and sororicide
1985 comedy films
1980s American films